The Republic of the Congo, also known as  Congo-Brazzaville or the Congo, is a country in Central Africa. It is bordered by Gabon, Cameroon, the Central African Republic, the Democratic Republic of the Congo, the Angolan exclave province of Cabinda, and the Gulf of Guinea.

The republic is a former French colony.  Upon independence in 1960, the former French region of Middle Congo became the Republic of the Congo. After a quarter century of Marxism, Congo completed its transition into a multi-party democracy in 1992. However, a brief civil war in 1997 ended in the restoration of former Marxist President Denis Sassou Nguesso to power.

Articles (arranged alphabetically) related to the Republic of the Congo include:



A 
 AfricaPhonebook/Annulaires Afrique
 Alcan in Africa
 Aluminum mining
 Armed Forces of the Republic of the Congo

B 
 Brazzaville

C 
 Communications in the Republic of the Congo
 Democratic Republic of the Congo Kinshasa
 Republic of the Congo Brazzaville
 Congo River
 Constituencies of the Republic of the Congo

D

E 
 Economy of the Republic of the Congo
 Education in the Republic of the Congo

F

G 
 Gabon
 Geography of the Republic of the Congo

H

I

J

K 
 Kinshasa

L 
 LGBT rights in the Republic of the Congo (Gay rights)
 List of cities in the Republic of the Congo
 List of Congolese people from the Republic of the Congo
 List of national parks of the Republic of the Congo
 List of African writers (by country)#Congo

M 
 Mining
 Justin Mikolo-Kinzonzi
 Music of the Republic of the Congo

N

O 
 Odzala-Kokoua National Park

P 
 Pointe-Noire
 Politics of the Republic of the Congo
 People's Republic of the Congo

Q

R 
 Regions of the Republic of the Congo
 Republic of the Congo

S 
Scouting in the Republic of the Congo

T 
 Transport in the Republic of the Congo

U

V 
 Visa requirements for Republic of the Congo citizens

W

X

Y

Z 
 Zaire

See also
Lists of country-related topics - similar lists for other countries

 
Congo (Brazzaville)